Maynard High School may refer to:

In the United States:
 Maynard High School (Arkansas), based in Maynard, Arkansas.
 Maynard High School (Massachusetts), based in Maynard, Massachusetts.
 Maynard Evans High School, based in Orlando, Florida.
 Maynard H. Jackson High School, based in Atlanta, Georgia.

In the United Kingdom:
 The Maynard School, based in Exeter, Devon, England.